The A- and B-class destroyers were a group of 18 destroyers built for the Royal Navy during the late 1920s, with two additional ships built for the Royal Canadian Navy. The British ships were divided into two flotillas of eight destroyers, each with a flotilla leader.

Design and description
The initial staff requirements were unrealistic and would have resulted in a much larger, unaffordable ship; they were scaled back, both to reduce the size of the ship and to save money. The As were fitted with the Two-Speed Destroyer Sweep (TSDS) minesweeping gear and only had a residual anti-submarine ability while the Bs were equipped with Type 119 ASDIC (sonar) and had a full complement of depth charges, but could not use the TSDS. This was the beginning of the Admiralty's policy of alternating TSDS and anti-submarine capabilities between destroyer flotillas. The ships' complement was 138 officers and ratings as built, but increased in size up to 162 during the war.

The destroyers were powered by two Parsons geared steam turbines, each driving one propeller shaft, using steam provided by three water-tube boilers equipped with superheaters. Her specific fuel consumption was reduced from /hp/hour in her sisters to /hp/hour, although she was plagued by mechanical problems for her whole life.

All of the ships had the same main armament, four quick-firing (QF)  Mark IX guns in single mounts with enlarged gun shields, designated 'A', 'B', 'X', and 'Y' from front to rear. Although the A class were intended to be equipped with gun mounts that could elevate up to 40°, and 'B' gun on a high-angle mount capable of 60°, all four guns ultimately had a maximum elevation of 30°. Each gun was provided with 190 rounds. For anti-aircraft (AA) defence, the A- and B-class ships carried two  QF two-pounder Mark II AA guns mounted on platforms between the funnels, each with 500 rounds. They were fitted with two quadruple mounts for 21-inch (533 mm) torpedo tubes. The A-class ships were initially going to be fitted with two throwers and four chutes for eight depth charges, but they interfered with the TSDS equipment so the throwers, one chute and two depth charges were removed. The Bs were equipped with two throwers and one rack for twenty depth charges. While not initially fitted with ASDIC, space was reserved for it, and at least some of the As received it beginning in the late 1930s.

The fire-control system for these ships was little advanced over their First World War-era predecessors. A pedestal-mounted, manually operated Destroyer Director Sight and a separate  rangefinder positioned to its rear were situated above the bridge; the director transmitted training angles and firing impulses to the main guns, which fired at fixed elevations. They had no capability for anti-aircraft fire and the anti-aircraft guns were aimed solely by eye. No fire-control computer was initially installed, but an Admiralty Fire Control Clock Mark II was retrofitted after it had been proven in the subsequent C-class destroyers.

Canadian ships
The two Canadian ships (Saguenay and Skeena) were designed to be of a similar performance to the A-class ships to allow them to tactically combine. More flare was given to the bow to keep it drier and the forward part of the hull was strengthened to withstand ice. Their metacentric height was increased to allow for the build-up of ice and snow on the upperworks and they were  shorter than their British counterparts. Although the ships had an additional  of fuel,  fewer horsepower and lacked superheaters for their boilers, they had the same range and speed as their brethren of the A and B classes. The ships were built by John I. Thornycroft & Company in Woolston, Hampshire and had the broad, slab-sided funnels characteristic of that builder.

Flotilla leaders
 was built to an enlarged design to accommodate the commander of the destroyer flotilla (Captain (D)) and his staff, some 47 additional officers and ratings. She shipped a fifth 4.7-inch gun between the funnels, which forced the two-pounders to be repositioned abaft the rear funnel, and was not fitted with TSDS. However, the increased length made her somewhat unhandy, having a turning circle much greater than the standard A class, which complicated manoeuvres with her flotilla.

Unlike Codrington, Keith was built upon the same hull as her sisters to save money and to make her tactically identical to her flotilla-mates. The initial proposal was to enlarge the aft deckhouse to make room for the Captain (D) and his staff at the expense of 'Y' gun and the TSDS gear, but the gun was reinstated while she was under construction. The ship was too small to accommodate the entirety of the staff, and Blanche was fitted as a divisional leader to carry the surplus.

Wartime modifications
The initial wartime modifications were limited and mostly related to the survivability of the crew, aside from the addition of 50 rounds per gun of 4.7-inch ammunition and the increase of depth charge stowage to 42 (the Canadian ships carried 33). Beginning in May 1940, the after bank of torpedo tubes was removed in most ships and replaced with a QF  20-cwt anti-aircraft gun, the after mast and funnel being cut down to improve the gun's field of fire. Of the early war losses, only Codrington and Acheron received this modification before they were sunk. By October, all of the surviving A-class ships plus Beagle, Boadicea, Boreas and Brilliant had been modified and the rest of the Bs had received theirs by April 1941.

Beginning in 1941, most ships had 'Y' gun and the TSDS gear replaced by racks and throwers for a pattern of 10 depth charges, with stowage increased to 70 charges. Their light AA armament was augmented by a pair of QF Oerlikon  guns, one each abreast the bridge, and a Type 286 short-range, surface-search radar, adapted from the Royal Air Force's ASV radar, was also added. The early models, however, could only scan directly forward and had to be aimed by turning the entire ship. The Canadian ships replaced their two-pounders with a pair of quadruple  machine guns and were not fitted with Oerlikons by 1942.

Late that year, some of the surviving ships were further modified into what became known as escort destroyers. These ships had either 'A' or 'B' gun replaced by a Hedgehog anti-submarine spigot mortar. Achates, Beagle, Boreas, and Bulldog were among the first ships to be so converted. Around this same time many ships had their Destroyer Director Sight and rangefinder exchanged for a Type 271 target-indication radar. Beagle and Bulldog were later fitted with a two-pounder bow chaser to engage German E-boats in the English Channel while Boadicea received two elderly six-pounder (57 mm) Hotchkiss guns to deal with U-boats on the surface at close range.

Beginning in 1943, the three-inch gun was removed to allow for the installation of a Huff-Duff radio direction finder on a short mainmast; the aft torpedo tubes were sometimes reinstalled. The single 20 mm guns abreast the bridge were replaced by Mark V powered mountings for twin weapons later in the war, the singles replacing the two-pounder or .50 caliber guns amidships, with a further pair of Oerlikons that replaced the searchlight between the torpedo tubes.

Ships

A-class ships

B-class ships

Service
The class saw much service in the Second World War, being involved in convoy protection and anti-submarine warfare in home waters and the North Atlantic. Codrington was sunk by German air attack at Dover on 27 July 1940.  was sunk by a mine off the Isle of Wight on 17 December 1940.  was sunk by two large German heavy cruisers,  and Lützow while defending an Arctic convoy in the Battle of the Barents Sea.  was so badly damaged when the ammunition ship  blew up on 4 August 1943 at Algiers that she could not be repaired and was towed to Taranto and paid off. Skeena was wrecked in a storm off Iceland on 25 October 1944. Saguenay was heavily damaged in a collision with the merchant ship Azara and was consigned to the role of a training ship after being repaired.

The surviving ships were worn out from war duties and were scrapped soon after the war.

Notes

Footnotes

References

 
 
 
 
 
 
 

 
 
 

 
Destroyer classes
Ship classes of the Royal Navy